Mykyta Nesterenko (born 15 April 1991) is a Ukrainian discus thrower, born in Dnipro.

Career
His personal best throw with the 2 kilogram implement is 66.42 metres, achieved in June 2021 in Lutsk. With the junior discus (1.750 kg) he has a best of 70.13 metres, achieved in May 2008 in Halle, Saxony-Anhalt. This is the current junior world record. With the 1.500 kg discus he also holds the world youth best with a distance of 77.50 metres, established in Kyiv on May 19, 2008.

Nesterenko has personal bests in the shot put of 22.44 metres in 2008 with the 5 kilogram weight and 18.97 metres (indoors) with the senior weight in 2009.

Achievements

References

1991 births
Living people
Sportspeople from Dnipro
Ukrainian male discus throwers
Athletes (track and field) at the 2012 Summer Olympics
Athletes (track and field) at the 2016 Summer Olympics
Olympic athletes of Ukraine
Ukrainian Athletics Championships winners
Athletes (track and field) at the 2020 Summer Olympics